The Louisiana Community Colleges Athletic Conference (LCCAC) is a member conference of the National Junior College Athletic Association (NJCAA). It, along  with the MACJC, are members of Region XXIII (or Region 23). 

The conference was once known as the MISS-LOU Junior College Conference, up until its name change in early 2019.

The members of the LCCAC do not have football programs whereas the members of the MACJC do.

The LCCAC is a junior college conference for many technical and community colleges. Conference championships are held in most sports and individuals can be named to All-Conference and All-Academic teams.  At one time, Meridian Community College in Meridian, Mississippi was a member of the LCCAC, however MCC left the conference in 2002 for the MACJC in order to cut travel expenses.

Members
Baton Rouge Community College 
Delgado Community College 
Louisiana State University at Eunice
Nunez Community College
Southern University at Shreveport

Former members
Bossier Parish Community College

See also
National Junior College Athletic Association (NJCAA)
NJCAA Region 23
Mississippi Association of Community & Junior Colleges, also in NJCAA Region 23

Resources
NJCAA Website

NJCAA conferences
College sports in Louisiana